Condylostylus coloradensis is a species of long-legged fly in the family Dolichopodidae.

References

Sciapodinae
Articles created by Qbugbot
Insects described in 1932